Sri Ranga Jeyaratnam (born 22 January 1971), also known J. Sri Ranga, is a Sri Lankan Tamil broadcaster, politician and former Member of Parliament.

Early life
Jeyaratnam was born on 22 January 1971. He was educated at Vavuniya Tamil Madhya Maha Vidyalayam and Jaffna Hindu College. He then entered the University of Colombo where he was captain of the football team.

Career
After university Jeyaratnam joined MBC Networks, presenting the Erimalai (volcano) programme on Shakthi FM. He later moved to television, presenting the Minnal (lightning) programme on Shakthi TV. This programme was very popular amongst the Up-country Tamils, particularly the youth. He is leader of the Citizen's Front (CF).

Jeyaratnam has close ties with President Mahinda Rajapaksa's family and is a close friend of his son Namal Rajapaksa. According to leaked U.S. diplomatic cables the president's brother, Defence Secretary Gotabhaya Rajapaksa, was "incensed" by the way Jeyaratnam handled abductions carried out by government backed paramilitary groups, such as the Eelam People's Democratic Party (EPDP), on his TV programme. According to the cable the president told Jeyaratnam to leave the country, offering him a diplomatic position in Oslo, otherwise EPDP leader Douglas Devananda would have Jeyaratnam killed. The cable also claims that Jeyaratnam feared being assassinated by the rebel Liberation Tigers of Tamil Eelam who considered him to be a Rajapaksa stooge.

During 2005 and 2006 Jeyaratnam and his family received several threats from unidentified persons. In November 2006, after Jeyaratnam's TV programme featured the assassination of Tamil National Alliance MP Nadarajah Raviraj, the police informed Shakthi TV that Jeyaratnam's life was in danger. On 3 February 2010 an unidentified group attacked the vehicle he was travelling in near Hatton.

Jeyaratnam contested the 2010 parliamentary election as one of the United National Front's candidates in Nuwara Eliya District and was elected to Parliament. Jeyaratnam did not contest the 2015 parliamentary election but was instead placed on the United People's Freedom Alliance's (UPFA) list of National List candidates. However, after the election he was not appointed to the National List.

Electoral history

References

1971 births
Alumni of Jaffna Hindu College
Alumni of the University of Colombo
Living people
Members of the 14th Parliament of Sri Lanka
People from Northern Province, Sri Lanka
Sri Lankan Hindus
Sri Lankan Tamil broadcasters
Sri Lankan Tamil politicians